Chico MacMurtrie was born in New Mexico in 1961.  He has been awarded four grants from the National Endowment for the Arts for Interdisciplinary Artists. In 1990 he received the San Francisco Bay Guardian Goldie Award.

In 1992 MacMurtrie formed Amorphic Robot Works, a group of artists and engineers working together to create robotic art performances and installations.  His permanent commissioned interactive sculptures include the anthropomorphic Urge to Stand at Yerba Buena Gardens in San Francisco, Fetus to Man sculpture/clock for the city of Lille France, and Growing Raining Tree at Contemporary Arts Center in Cincinnati OH.

ARW's Artistic Director Chico MacMurtrie, describes his vision, "The work is an ongoing endeavor to uncover the primacy of movement and sound. Each machine is inspired or influenced, both, by modern society, and what I physically experience and sense. The whole of this input informs my ideas and work."

External links
Amorphic Robot Works
Chico Macmurtrie interview

1961 births
Living people
Robotic art